Euro gold and silver commemorative coins are special euro coins minted and issued by member states of the Eurozone, mainly in gold and silver, although other metals are also used on rare occasions. Malta introduced the euro (€) on 1 January 2008. In a short time, the Central Bank of Malta has been producing both normal issues of Maltese euro coins, which are intended for circulation, and commemorative euro coins in gold and silver.

These special coins have a legal tender only in Malta, unlike the normal issues of the Maltese euro coins, which have a legal tender in every country of the Eurozone. This means that the commemorative coins made of gold and silver cannot be used as money in other countries. Furthermore, as their bullion value generally vastly exceeds their face value, these coins are not intended to be used as means of payment at all—although it remains possible. For this reason, they are usually named Collectors' coins.

The coins usually commemorate the anniversaries of historical events or draw attention to current events of special importance to Malta.

Summary 

The following table shows the number of coins minted per year. In the first section, the coins are grouped by the metal used, while in the second section they are grouped by their face value.

2008 Coinage

2009 Coinage

2010 Coinage

2011 Coinage

2012 Coinage

2013 Coinage

2014 Coinage

2015 Coinage

2016 Coinage

2017 Coinage

2018 Coinage

In addition, €25, €50 and €100 gold coins were issued on 30 November 2018. These are Melita bullion coins, not commemorative coins.

2019 Coinage

2020 Coinage

Notes

References

Euro commemorative coins
Coins of Malta
Currencies of Malta

fr:Liste des pièces maltaises en euro de collection